Varadi or Váradi is a surname. Notable people with the surname include:

Adam Varadi (born 1985), Czech footballer
Benedek Váradi (born 1995), Hungarian basketball player
Hédi Váradi (1929–1987), Hungarian actress
Imre Varadi (born 1959), English footballer
János Váradi (born 1961), Hungarian boxer

See also
Varady

Hungarian-language surnames